The surname Dodd is one of the first names recorded and is of Ancient Welsh Celtic origin in the West of England. It may also have Germanic origins if found in the East of England, stemming from a description of something "round or plump" as a surname based on nicknames. The surname Dodd may also be derived from the Old English word "dydrian", in East England which means deceiver or rascal, or from the word "dod", which means to make bare or to cut off. The application of the name Dodd is obvious in the former case, while the nickname would denote a bald person in the latter case.

Notable people with the surname include:

Government
Charles J. Dodd (New York politician) (1873–1947), American lawyer, politician, and judge
Christopher Dodd (born 1944), American politician and lobbyist
Cyril Dodd (1844–1913), British politician
Jabez Edward Dodd (1867–1928), Western Australian politician
Thomas J. Dodd (1907–1971), American politician and prosecutor
William Dodd (ambassador) (1869–1940), historian and diplomat

Performing and modelling
Cal Dodd (born 1956), voice actor
Carl Nicholas Henty-Dodd (1935–2009), British TV and radio presenter better known as Simon Dee
Claire Dodd (1908–1973), American actress
Dick Dodd (1945–2013), American actor and musician
Hannah Dodd (born 1995), English actress
James William Dodd (1740–1796), English actor
Jimmie Dodd (James Wesley Dodd, 1910–1964), American actor, singer and songwriter
Ken Dodd (1927–2018), British comedian
Marcie Dodd, (born 1978), American stage actress and singer
Mikyla Dodd (born 1978), British actress
Molly Dodd (1921–1981), American actress
Rory Dodd, singer
Steve Dodd (1928–2014), Australian actor
Sue Anna Dodd (born 1996), Filipino actress better known as Sue Ramirez

Sports figures
Bobby Dodd (1908–1988), American college football coach
Brad Dodd (born 1977), Australian Rules footballer
Jason Dodd (born 1970), English footballer
Jimmy Dodd (footballer) (1933–2017), English footballer
Joe Dodd (born 1946), English pro darts player
Karl Dodd (born 1980), Australian soccer player
Marjorie Dodd (1894–1968), tennis player
Mark Dodd (born 1965), American soccer player
Robert Dodd (baseball) (born 1973), American baseball player
Robert Dodd (footballer), English association footballer
Sean Dodd (born 1984), British boxer
Stephen Dodd (born 1966), Welsh golfer
Steven Dodd (born 1983), Australian Rules footballer
Travis Dodd (born 1980), Australian soccer player

Creators of expressive works
Anna Bowman Dodd (1858–1929), American author
Bella Dodd (1904–1969), author
Derrick Dodd, the pen-name of Frank Harrison Gassaway, American humorist and poet
Ed Dodd (1902–1991), American cartoonist
Emma Dodd (born 1969), British children's author and illustrator
Francis Dodd (1874–1949), artist
James Dodd (born 1977), Australian artist better known as Dlux
Lamar Dodd (1909–1996), American painter
Lynley Dodd (born 1941), New Zealand children's writer
Mary Ann Hanmer Dodd (1813–1878), American poet
Maurice Dodd (1922–2005), English cartoonist
Robert Dodd (artist) (1748–1815), British marine painter

Academics and educators
A. H. Dodd (1891–1975), Welsh historian
C. H. Dodd (1884–1973), Welsh Bible scholar
Clarence Orvil Dodd (1899–1955), American writer and church elder
Charles Dodd (c.1671–1743), pseudonym of British historian Hugh Tootell
David Dodd (1895–1988), economist and educator
Percy Dodd (1889–1931), Welsh classicist
Sandra Dodd (born 1953), American unschooling advocate
Stuart C. Dodd (1900–1975), sociologist

Others
Clifford Dodd, Australian radio executive
Coxsone Dodd (1932–2004), Jamaican record producer
Dana Dodd (1985–2006), American murder victim, formerly known as "Lavender Doe"
David Owen Dodd (1846–1864), hanged as a Confederate spy in the American Civil War
R. Fielding Dodd (c.1890–1958), Scottish architect
James Dodd (disambiguation), several people, including
James Jonas Dodd (1863–1925), English political activist
James Munro Dodd (1915–1986), marine biologist
Josiah Eustace Dodd (1856–1952), South Australian pipe organ builder
Martha Dodd (1908–1990), American spy
Moses Woodruff Dodd (1813–1899), American publisher
Phillip James Dodd (born 1971), English-American architect
Ralph Dodd (1756—1822), English civil engineer and marine painter.
Robert Dodd (disambiguation), several people, including
Robert F. Dodd (1844–1903), Canadian soldier who fought in the American Civil War
Sonora Smart Dodd (1882–1978), American activist and founder of Father's Day
Townsend F. Dodd (1886–1919), American aviator, first US pilot to receive the Distinguished Service Medal
Westley Allan Dodd (1961–1993), American serial killer
William Dodd (clergyman) (1729–1777), British religious leader, scholar and forger

Fictional characters
William Dodd, a villain in the Richard Sharpe book series and its TV adaptation

See also

Dodd (disambiguation) 
Dodds (surname)

References

English-language surnames